Wrestling at the 1932 Summer Olympics was held between August 1–7 August at the Grand Olympic Auditorium. It was split into two disciplines, Freestyle and Greco-Roman which were further divided into different weight categories.

Competition format
Wrestling events consisted of a series of random matches and a system of points to decide elimination after each round. Matches were scored as follows: The results of the bouts were counted on "bad points". Losers received 3 points for each bout lost, those who won by decision of the jury received 1 point, and those who won by pin received 0 points. Those  competitors who accumulated 5 bad points were eliminated. If candidates for the third place were eliminated with equal bad points in the same round, they were paired, if they have not yet met each other, for the third place.

Medal table

Medal summary

Greco-Roman

Freestyle

Participating nations
18 nations participated in Wrestling at the 1932 Olympics:

References

External links
 
 Official Olympic Report

 
1932 Summer Olympics events
1932
Wrestling in Los Angeles
1932 in sports in California